PKS1353-341, also known as LEDA 88936 is a quasar (99% chance) located in the southern constellation Centaurus. It has an apparent magnitude of 18.5, making it only visible in powerful telescopes. Based on the objects luminosity, it is estimated to be 3.7 billion light years distant from the Solar System. It is receding from the Milky Way with a heliocentric radial velocity of 

The object was first identified by R.A. Preston in 1985. Before then, it was unnoticed. Anaylsis in 1998 reveal that it might be relatively dusty based on the quasar's X-ray properties; Long thought to be solitary, the CHiPS (Clusters Hiding in Plain Sight) Survey found PSZ2 G317.79+26.63, a massive galaxy cluster surrounding the quasar. The team analyzed data from the 2MASS, NVSS, ROSAT, SUMSS, and WISE all-sky surveys in order to locatepowerful sources of infrared, radio, and X-ray light. The goal was to discover new galaxy clusters that were previously misidentified as isolated sources of X-ray light due to the central quasar's brightness.

As an individual object, PKS1353-341 has a central mass 300 billion times that of the Sun, which is 1/4 of the Milky Way's mass. It has an absolute magnitude of −22.4 in the blue passband, making it very luminous. The galaxy hosting PKS1353-341 is a compact dwarf galaxy. Typical of quasars, PKS1353-341 has two jets originating from the center of the galaxy.

References 

Galaxy clusters
Quasars
Astronomical X-ray sources
Centaurus (constellation)
Dwarf galaxies